István Pisont (born 16 May 1970) is a Hungarian former international footballer, and manager. He is currently the coach of the Hungarian national U-17 team. He has been interim manager of Budapest Honvéd FC on two occasions.

Career
Pisont started his professional career in the Hungarian League with Budapest Honvéd FC. After a few years spent with the Budapest side, he decided to move on to the Belgium League where he signed for R. Charleroi S.C. in the 1994–95 season. After spending  one season in Belgium, he moved to Israel where he played for Beitar Jerusalem F.C. in the 1995–96 season.

In the 1995–96 season, Pisont decided to join the Israeli team of Beitar Jerusalem where he scored 6 goals in the first season. In the 1996–97 season, he scored 5 goals for Beitar Jerusalem and in the season 1997–98, he improved his performance by scoring 15 goals.

For the 1998–99 season he was offered a place in the Eintracht Frankfurt team.

However, after one year only, he returned to Israel where this time he played for Hapoel Tel Aviv from the 1999–2000 season to the 2001–02 season. In 2002, Pisont was a star of the Hapoel Tel Aviv team that was the first Israeli team to reach the quarter final of the UEFA Cup.

In 2003, he left Bnei Yehuda to join MTK Hungaria FC on a free transfer for one year.

His last match 21 April 2004 against DVSC.

International career
Pisont gained 31 caps for Hungary between 1991 and 1999 and scored once, against Azerbaijan in 1998.

Managerial career
On 19 March 2020 he was appointed as the interim manager of Budapest Honvéd FC until the end of the season. He replaced Giuseppe Sannino, won the Magyar Kupa (Hungarian Cup).  He has been appointed again as interim manager at the end of the same year for nine games and stayed kept working for the club after his second spell ended as a first team manager.

Career honours

Player
Honvéd
 Hungarian League: 1991, 1993

Beitar Jerusalem
 Israeli Championship: 1996-97, 1997–98
 Toto Cup Al: 1997-98

Hapoel Tel Aviv
 Israeli Championship: 1999-2000
 Israel State Cup: 1999-2000
 Toto Cup Al: 2001-02

Manager
Honvéd
 Magyar Kupa 2019–20

References

External links
 

1970 births
Living people
Association football midfielders
Hungarian footballers
Hungary international footballers
Israeli Premier League players
Budapest Honvéd FC players
MTK Budapest FC players
Eintracht Frankfurt players
R. Charleroi S.C. players
Beitar Jerusalem F.C. players
Hapoel Tel Aviv F.C. players
Bnei Yehuda Tel Aviv F.C. players
Expatriate footballers in Israel
Hungarian football managers
Budapest Honvéd FC managers
Nemzeti Bajnokság I managers
People from Orosháza
Sportspeople from Békés County